NK Urania Baška Voda are a football team from Baška Voda, Croatia, currently playing in the Treća HNL, the third division of Croatian football. They were founded in 1922 and named after Urania, the daughter of Zeus.

NK Urania won promotion from the 2017 1.ŽNL, the Croatian fourth division, and started the 2018 season well, standing in 6th place at the halfway mark of the season.

References

Football clubs in Croatia
Association football clubs established in 1922
1922 establishments in Croatia